Yu Xun-fa (俞遜發) (January 8, 1946 – January 21, 2006), was a Chinese flute player who invented the wind-instrument known as the koudi. Born in Shanghai, he popularized the art of the flute in Chinese culture during the 1970s.

Biography 

In elementary school, Yu studied Chinese flute. He participated in the Shanghai "Red Children" Troupe in 1958, and studied under dizi performer Lu Chunling as a disciple.

In 1971, Yu invented koudi - a small flute made from bamboo. During the 1970s he was most active; touring parts of Europe, Canada, and Asia. He died January 21, 2006, due to liver cancer.

Discography 

 Zhu: Symphonic Fantasia - In Memory of Martyrs for Truth; Sketches in the Mountains of Guizhou; Symphony No. 4 (1995)
Lake View on a Moonlit Autumn Night (1996)
 MASTERPIECES on Chinese Wind Instruments: A Visit to Suzhou (2004)
 Master of Chinese Traditional Music: Di Flute Perform Fish Xunfa (2005)
 Song Of Plum Blossom (2006)

Compilations 

 Treasure of Traditional Music Vol. 3 (1997)
 Anthology Of Chinese Traditional and Folk Music: DIZI Vol. 5 (1994)

References 

Deaths from liver cancer
1946 births
2006 deaths